Dadisetti Ramalingeswara Rao, commonly known as Raja, is the current Member of the Legislative Assembly (India) of Tuni in East Godavari District.
He is from the YSR Congress Party.

Personal life 
Dadisetti Ramalingeswara Rao was born on 22 March 1976 to Sri Dadisetti Sankara Rao and Smt Satyanarayanamma in Tuni, Andhra Pradesh. They are traditionally a family of gold merchants.
Rao graduated in Tuni.
At the age of 32, he decided to enter politics full-time and joined the YSR Congress Party.

He is married to Smt Lakshmi Chaitanya and has one son and one daughter.

Politics 

Ramalingeswara Rao contested MLA elections for the first time in 2014 and won with a majority of 19500 votes.
He is currently a member of the committee on public accounts in the Andhra Pradesh Legislative Assembly, Tuni In 2019. Now he is Minister of A.P. cabinet.

References 

Living people
21st-century Indian politicians
1976 births
Andhra Pradesh MLAs 2019–2024